Paul Pawlak Jr. (born July 25, 1940) is a former American football coach.  He served as the head football coach at Tufts University from 1974 to 1977 and at Northeastern University from 1981 to 1990, compiling a career college football record of 49–85–1. He is Ukrainian and Slavic.

Head coaching record

References

1940 births
Living people
Cornell Big Red football coaches
NFL Europe (WLAF) coaches
Northeastern Huskies football coaches
Springfield Pride football coaches
Southern Connecticut State University alumni
The Citadel Bulldogs football coaches
Tufts Jumbos football coaches
UMass Minutemen football coaches
Washington & Jefferson Presidents football coaches